The  Green Bay Blizzard season was the team's fifteenth season as a professional indoor football franchise and eighth in the Indoor Football League (IFL). One of ten teams that competed in the IFL for the 2017 season, the Blizzard were members of the United Conference.

Led by head coach Corey Roberson, the Blizzard played their home games at the Resch Center in the Green Bay suburb of Ashwaubenon, Wisconsin.

Staff

Schedule
Key:

Regular season

All start times are local time

Standings

Roster

References

External links
Green Bay Blizzard official statistics

Green Bay Blizzard seasons
Green Bay Blizzard
Green Bay Blizzard